John Stephens Peyton (born July 28, 1964) is an American businessman and politician who is currently president of Gate Petroleum. He served as Mayor of Jacksonville, Florida from 2003 to 2011, when he was succeeded by Alvin Brown. He was the second Republican to be elected to the position since 1888. After his term he returned to Gate, his family business, and succeeded his father Herb Peyton as the company's president in January 2012.

Biography
Peyton's father is Herb Peyton, founder and principal owner of Gate Petroleum, one of the largest privately held companies in the state. They have made a considerable fortune developing, buying and selling land to both the state and federal governments, as well as owning Ponte Vedra Inn and Club and other clubs and resorts, 225 Gate Gas and convenience stores in the southeastern United States, and several other businesses. Prior to his election as mayor, Peyton served as board Chairman for the Jacksonville Transportation Authority; Vice President of Gate and serving as chairman of the Board of Directors for the Jacksonville Symphony Orchestra and Greenscape of Jacksonville.

Peyton attended Mercer University and earned a bachelor's degree, then graduated from the Harvard Business School Executive Education Program.

A long-time bachelor, Peyton became engaged during his first campaign and married Jacksonville physician Kathryn Pearson on June 1, 2003. They have two sons, John Conner, born in 2005, and Kent Thomas, born in 2007. Peyton is an Episcopalian.

Mayor of Jacksonville
Peyton was elected as the 6th mayor of Jacksonville in 2003. At age 38, Peyton was one of the youngest mayors serving a major city in Florida at the time. Peyton survived a crowded Republican primary and defeated the county's Democratic sheriff, Nat Glover, for the seat in a race that was the most expensive in Jacksonville history. He took office in 2003, succeeding John Delaney. In 2007, Peyton defeated community activist Jackie Brown by a margin over 50% to win a second term. Priorities include solidification of the River Accord, Seeds of Change, and his popular early literacy program RALLY Jacksonville!, aimed at educating four-year-olds.

Back to Gate
Peyton's term of office ended on July 1, 2011, and Alvin Brown took office as the city's first African-American mayor. In a January 9, 2009 interview in the Financial News & Daily Record, Peyton was asked about his plans for 2011 when his term ended. He responded:

Peyton returned to Gate following his terms, briefly serving as vice president while he got up to speed on the company businesses. In January 2012, Gate announced John Peyton would succeed his father as president, while his father will take a less active role in the company.

References

External links

Biography, from the City of Jacksonville website
Gate Petroleum

1964 births
Living people
Mayors of Jacksonville, Florida
Mercer University alumni
Harvard Business School alumni
American energy industry businesspeople
Florida Republicans
Gate Petroleum